Sidney Green (born January 4, 1961) is an American former professional basketball player and former coach. He played college basketball for the UNLV Runnin' Rebels and was drafted into the National Basketball Association (NBA) by the Chicago Bulls in 1983. After a ten-year career in the NBA he went into college coaching. He now works as a Chicago Bulls team ambassador.

Life
Green was born in Brooklyn, New York. A 6'9" forward/center, Green attended the University of Nevada, Las Vegas, where he played for the UNLV Runnin' Rebels basketball team. Green's final game for UNLV was the team's second round loss to eventual champion North Carolina State in 1983. He was an All-American selection, and was drafted by the Chicago Bulls in the first round of the 1983 NBA Draft.  In his ten-year NBA career, he played for the Bulls, Detroit Pistons, New York Knicks, Orlando Magic, San Antonio Spurs and Charlotte Hornets. He retired in 1993 with 5,080 career points and 4,128 career rebounds.

After retiring from the NBA, Green went into coaching. He coached at Southampton College from 1995–1997, and was head coach of the University of North Florida Ospreys from 1997–1999, and the Florida Atlantic University Owls from 1999–2005. On September 24, 2009, Green was named a player development assistant for the Chicago Bulls. He later became a Bulls community relations ambassador.

His son, Taurean Green, played for the University of Florida team that won the 2006 and 2007 NCAA Men's Division I Basketball Championships. Taurean Green has played professionally in the NBA and in Europe.

See also
List of NCAA Division I men's basketball players with 2000 points and 1000 rebounds

References

External links
Career stats at https://www.basketball-reference.com

1961 births
Living people
African-American basketball coaches
African-American basketball players
All-American college men's basketball players
American men's basketball coaches
American men's basketball players
Basketball coaches from New York (state)
Basketball players from New York City
Centers (basketball)
Charlotte Hornets players
Chicago Bulls draft picks
Chicago Bulls players
College men's basketball head coaches in the United States
Detroit Pistons players
Florida Atlantic Owls men's basketball coaches
Indiana Hoosiers men's basketball coaches
McDonald's High School All-Americans
New York Knicks players
North Florida Ospreys men's basketball coaches
Orlando Magic expansion draft picks
Orlando Magic players
Parade High School All-Americans (boys' basketball)
Power forwards (basketball)
San Antonio Spurs players
Sportspeople from Brooklyn
Thomas Jefferson High School (Brooklyn) alumni
UNLV Runnin' Rebels basketball players
21st-century African-American people
20th-century African-American sportspeople